The Queen's Gates is the formal entrance to Parliament Hill, the location of the Canadian parliament buildings, in Ottawa, Ontario. Built in 1872 and set into the fence, known as the Wellington Wall, between piers designed in the Victorian High Gothic style that was fashionable in Canada at the time, the gates sit on the central axis of the hill's landscaping, in line with the Centennial Flame and Peace Tower beyond, and open onto Wellington Street.

By the early 1990s, neither the piers nor the ironwork had been properly renovated since their construction; salt from the street, the freeze-thaw cycle, and pollution had damaged and disintegrated the grout and stone faces. Thus, in 1992, Public Works and Government Services Canada began a $5 million restoration project of the entire fence along Wellington, which included the Queen's Gates. The piers were fully repointed and stabilised, including their foundations, and the gates were restored and partly rebuilt by a blacksmith.

References

External links
 M.H. Stoneworks Inc. images of the Queen's Gates and restoration thereof

Parliament of Canada buildings
Gothic Revival architecture in Ottawa
1876 in Canada
Buildings and structures completed in 1876
Gates in Canada